New York State Route 62 may refer to:

New York State Route 62 (1920s–1930) in Allegany, Wyoming, Genesee, and Orleans Counties
New York State Route 62 (1930–1932) in Cattaraugus and Erie Counties
U.S. Route 62 in New York, the only route numbered "62" in New York since the early 1930s